A torpedo tube is a cylindrical device for launching torpedoes.

There are two main types of torpedo tube: underwater tubes fitted to submarines and some surface ships, and deck-mounted units (also referred to as torpedo launchers) installed aboard surface vessels. Deck-mounted torpedo launchers are usually designed for a specific type of torpedo, while submarine torpedo tubes are general-purpose launchers, and are often also capable of deploying mines and cruise missiles. Most modern launchers are standardized on a  diameter for light torpedoes (deck mounted aboard ship) or a  diameter for heavy torpedoes (underwater tubes), although other sizes of torpedo tube have been used: see Torpedo classes and diameters.

Submarine torpedo tube
A submarine torpedo tube is a more complex mechanism than a torpedo tube on a surface ship, because the tube has to accomplish the function of moving the torpedo from the normal atmospheric pressure within the submarine into the sea at the ambient pressure of the water around the submarine. Thus a submarine torpedo tube operates on the principle of an airlock.

Torpedo tube operation

The diagram illustrates the operation of a submarine torpedo tube. The diagram is somewhat simplified but does show the working of a submarine torpedo launch.

A torpedo tube has a considerable number of interlocks for safety reasons. For example, an interlock prevents the breech door and muzzle door from opening at the same time.

The submarine torpedo launch sequence is, in simplified form:

Open the breech door in the torpedo room. Load the torpedo into the tube.
Hook up the wire-guide connection and the torpedo power cable.
Shut and lock the breech door.
Turn on power to the torpedo. A minimum amount of time is required for torpedo warmup. Fire control programs are uploaded to the torpedo.
Flood the torpedo tube.  This may be done manually or automatically, from sea or from tanks, depending on the class of submarine.  The tube must be vented during this process to allow for complete filling and eliminate air pockets which could escape to the surface or cause damage when firing.
Open the equalizing valve to equalize pressure in the tube with ambient sea pressure.
Open the muzzle door.  If the tube is set up for Impulse Mode the slide valve will open with the muzzle door.  If Swim Out Mode is selected, the slide valve remains closed.  The slide valve allows water from the ejection pump to enter the tube.
When the launch command is given and all interlocks are satisfied, the water ram operates, thrusting a large volume of water into the tube at high pressure, which ejects the torpedo from the tube with considerable force. Modern torpedoes have a safety mechanism that prevents activation of the torpedo unless the torpedo senses the required amount of G-force.
The power cable is severed at launch. However, if a guidance wire is used, it remains connected through a drum of wire in the tube.  Torpedo propulsion systems vary but electric torpedoes swim out of the tube on their own and are of a smaller diameter.  Torpedoes with  diameter and fuel-burning engines usually start outside the tube.
Once outside the tube the torpedo begins its run toward the target as programmed by the fire control system.  Attack functions are programmed but with wire guided weapons, certain functions can be controlled from the ship.
For wire-guided torpedoes, the muzzle door must remain open because the guidance wire is still connected to the inside of the breech door to receive commands from the submarine's fire-control system. A wire cutter on the inside of the breech door is activated to release the wire and its protective cable.  These are drawn clear of the ship prior to shutting the muzzle door.
The drain cycle is a reverse of the flood cycle.  Water is returned to the boat's tanks and can be moved as necessary.  The tube must be vented to completely drain the tube since it is usually by gravity.
Open the breech door and remove the remnants of the torpedo power cable and the guidance wire basket.  The tube must be wiped dry to prevent a buildup of slime.  This process is called "diving the tube" and tradition dictates that "ye who shoots, dives".
Shut and lock the breech door.

Spare torpedoes are stored behind the tube in racks.

Speed is a desirable feature of a torpedo loading system, but safety is paramount. There are various manual and hydraulic handling systems for loading torpedoes into the tubes. SSNs prior to the  used a hydraulic system that was much faster and safer in conditions where the ship needed to maneuver.

The German Type 212 submarine uses a new development of the water ram expulsion system, which ejects the torpedo with water pressure to avoid acoustic detection.

See also

 List of torpedoes by name

References

External links
The Fleet Type Submarine Online 21-Inch Submerged Torpedo Tubes United States Navy Restricted Ordnance Pamphlet 1085, June 1944
Torpedo tubes of German U-Boats 

Torpedoes